Franck Chaussidière (born 1 August 1978) is a retired professional footballer who played as a defensive midfielder for ES Wasquehal, FC Istres, Stade Lavallois, Clermont Foot, and FC Rouen.

References

External links
 
 

Living people
1978 births
Association football midfielders
French footballers
RC Lens players
Wasquehal Football players
FC Istres players
Stade Lavallois players
Clermont Foot players
FC Rouen players